The 1950 World Table Tennis Championships were held in Budapest from January 29 to February 5, 1950.

Medalists

Team

Individual

References

External links
ITTF Museum

 
World Table Tennis Championships
World Table Tennis Championships
World Table Tennis Championships
Table tennis competitions in Hungary
International sports competitions in Budapest
World Table Tennis Championships
World Table Tennis Championships
1950s in Budapest